The Swiss Cup 2007-08 (Swisscom Cup) is the 83rd season of Switzerland's football knockout competition. The winner was FC Basel.  AC Bellinzona qualified for the UEFA Cup after finishing as runner-up due to Basel qualifying for the UEFA Champions League.

Format
In season 2007-08 the tournament structure was changed. The 10 clubs from the Swiss Super League as well as the 17 clubs of the Swiss Challenge League qualified directly for the cup and entered in the round of 64. FC Vaduz were not included in the cup as they play in the Liechtenstein Cup. 11 clubs from the 1st league as well as 26 clubs from the amateur leagues had to qualify in regional tournaments for the Swisscom Cup.  This was played in the knockout system.  Each round was held earlier because of the Euro 2008.  The final was held in April instead of May or June.

Each match was played over ninety minutes with extra time and a penalty shootout if required.

Round of 64 (15 and 16 September 2007) : The winning teams qualify for the 1/32 Finals.

Round of 32 (20 and 21  October 2007) : The winning teams qualify for the 1/16 Finals.

Round of 16 (24 and 25 of November 2007) :  The winning teams qualify for the Quarter-Finals.

Quarter Finals (15 and 16 of December 2007) :  The winning teams qualify for the Semi-Finals.

Semifinals (27 and 28 of February 2008) :  4 teams, the victors qualify for the Final.

Final (6 April 2008) :  The victor wins the 83rd Swiss cup.

Participating teams

Round of 64
Teams in the Super League and Challenge league are seeded cannot play each other.  The team that is in a lower league plays at home advantage.

|colspan="3" style="background-color:#99CCCC"|14 September 2007

|-
|colspan="3" style="background-color:#99CCCC"|15 September 2007

 
|-
|colspan="3" style="background-color:#99CCCC"|16 September 2007

|}

Round of 32
Super League teams cannot play each other.  A team in a lower league plays at home.

|colspan="3" style="background-color:#99CCCC"|20 October 2007

|-
|colspan="3" style="background-color:#99CCCC"|21 October 2007

|}

Round of 16
In this round there is no seeding.  Lower league teams play at home.

|colspan="3" style="background-color:#99CCCC"|24 November 2007

|-
|colspan="3" style="background-color:#99CCCC"|25 November 2007

|}

Quarter-finals
In this round there is no seeding.

|colspan="3" style="background-color:#99CCCC"|15 December 2007

|-
|colspan="3" style="background-color:#99CCCC"|16 December 2007

|}

Semi-finals
In this round there is no seeding.

|colspan="3" style="background-color:#99CCCC"|27 February 2008

|}

Final
This final did not take place in the traditional location of the Stade de Suisse in Bern. The pitch was being changed at the Stade de Suisse in order to be able to ready in June for the UEFA Euro 2008. As the replacement the St. Jakob-Park in Basel was picked. Also the date of the match was moved because of Euro 2008. The Final took place on 6 April 2008.

Swiss Cup seasons
Swiss Cup
Swiss Cup